Carlsen is a Danish-Norwegian patronymic surname meaning "son of Carl". The form Karlsen is cognate. The parallel Swedish forms are Carlsson and Karlsson. 

Notable people with the surname include:

 Agnete Carlsen (born 1971), Norwegian footballer, world champion and Olympic medalist
 Audun Carlsen, Norwegian person involved in an incident with the recording artist Boy George in 2007
 Christian Thomsen Carl, also referred to as Carlsen (1676-1713), Danish navy officer
 Dale Carlsen, American businessman
 Dines Carlsen (1901–1966), American painter
 Emil Carlsen (1853–1932), American painter
 Eric Carlsén (born 1982), Swedish curler
 Franziska Carlsen (1817–1876), Danish writer
 Gary Carlsen (born 1945), American discus thrower
 Henrik Carlsen (born 1959), Danish composer
 Henrik Kurt Carlsen (1914 ? - 1989), Danish sea captain
 Kenneth Carlsen (born 1973), Danish tennis player
 Kirsten Carlsen (born 1938), Danish cross-country skier
 Magnus Carlsen (born 1990), Norwegian chess grandmaster and World Champion
 Nils Carlsén (born 1985), Swedish curler
 Olav Sigurd Carlsen (1930–2013), Norwegian politician
 Per Carlsén (born 1960), Swedish curler
 Reidar Carlsen (1908–1987), Norwegian politician

See also
 Carlsen (disambiguation)
 Carlson (disambiguation)
 Carlson (name)
 Carlsten (name)
 Karlsen (surname)

Danish-language surnames
Norwegian-language surnames
Patronymic surnames
Surnames from given names

de:Carlsen